Aurenin is an antibiotic with the molecular formula C33H54O11.

References 

antibiotics
Heterocyclic compounds with 1 ring
Lactones
Polyols